Scandia is a city in Washington County, Minnesota, United States. The population was 3,984 at the 2020 census. Scandia is 25 miles northeast of Saint Paul, Minnesota, and is part of the Twin Cities Metro Area.

History
As evidenced by the town's name, Scandia has a rich Scandinavian heritage. It is the site of what is believed to have been Minnesota's first Swedish immigrant settlement. In 1850, the first log cabin was built on the shores of Hay Lake. The first sanctuary of Elim Lutheran Church was built in 1856 on a site near Hay Lake.

After many years as New Scandia Township, Scandia became a city on January 1, 2007, to allay concerns that the community could be annexed by the nearby city of Forest Lake. The city is served by a weekly newspaper, the Country Messenger.

Points of interest
 Gammelgården of Scandia has preserved, presented, and promoted Swedish immigrant heritage and history since 1972, with events such as Spelmansstämma, Midsommar Dag, and Dalapalooza. The latter is a reference to the Dalecarlian horses the city has erected to welcome visitors, in much the same way Saint Paul uses Peanuts characters.
 Hay Lake School was constructed in 1896. This was rural school district #2, organized in Washington County in 1855. After several years of holding school in local homes, the school was moved into the old Elim Lutheran Church building. The school used that structure, now a part of the Gammelgården complex, until this brick building was built. The school was placed on the National Register of Historic Places on July 1, 1970.
 The Erickson Log House Museum centers on the log house constructed in 1868 by Johannes Erickson and his 13-year-old son, Alfred. In 1904, Alfred Erickson constructed a new home and the old log home became at various times a granary, a garage, and a playhouse. In 1974, the Washington County Historical Society purchased the old log house and moved it one and a half miles to its present site. The Erickson Log House was placed on the National Register of Historic Places on June 17, 1976.
 The Washington County Barn Quilt Trail is a 16.4-mile (26.39-km) route that winds through Scandia, Marine on St. Croix, and the Town of May. Along the way are 18 barn quilts based on patterns in the book The Quiltmaker's Gift. The founder of the Washington County Barn Quilt Trail, Olivia Nienaber, wanted a theme to tie the quilts together. At the time she began developing the concept for the Washington County Barn Quilt Trail in 2015, she was 12 years old.

Geography
Scandia is halfway between Stillwater and Taylors Falls along the St. Croix River. It is close to William O'Brien State Park. State Highways 95 and 97 are two of the main routes in the community.

Demographics

2010 census
As of the census of 2010, there were 3,936 people, 1,499 households, and 1,178 families residing in the city. The racial makeup of the city was 97.2% White, 0.1% African American, 0.4% Native American, 1.0% Asian, 0.4% from other races, and 0.9% from two or more races. Hispanic or Latino of any race were 1.3% of the population.

Of Scandia's 1,499 households, 30.1% included children under 18, 69.9% were married couples living together, 5.1% had a female householder with no husband present, 3.5% had a male householder with no wife present, and 21.4% were non-families. 17.1% of all households were made up of individuals, and 7% had someone living alone who was 65 or older. The average household size was 2.61 and the average family size was 2.94.

The median age in the city was 46.9. 22.7% of residents were under 18; 5.5% were between 18 and 24; 18.4% were between 25 and 44; 38.9% were between 45 and 64; and 14.5% were over 64. The gender makeup of the city was 51.2% male and 48.8% female.

2000 census
As of the census of 2000, there were 3,692 people, 1,294 households, and 1,075 families residing in the township. The racial makeup of the township was 97.86% White, 0.24% African American, 0.19% Native American, 0.57% Asian, 0.05% Pacific Islander, 0.27% from other races, and 0.81% from two or more races. Hispanic or Latino of any race were 0.76% of the population.

There were 1,294 households, out of which 34.7% had children under the age of 18 living with them, 75.7% were married couples living together, 4.6% had a female householder with no husband present, and 16.9% were non-families. 12.9% of all households were made up of individuals, and 4.5% had someone living alone who was 65 years of age or older.  The average household size was 2.84 and the average family size was 3.12.

In the township the population was spread out, with 25.9% under the age of 18, 6.8% from 18 to 24, 26.3% from 25 to 44, 31.7% from 45 to 64, and 9.3% who were 65 years of age or older.  The median age was 40 years. For every 100 females, there were 107.1 males.  For every 100 females age 18 and over, there were 103.8 males.

The median income for a household in the township was $68,036, and the median income for a family was $76,389. Males had a median income of $45,298 versus $33,333 for females. The per capita income for the township was $27,399.  About 2.0% of families and 2.3% of the population were below the poverty line, including 1.2% of those under age 18 and 0.6% of those age 65 or over.

Notable people
Ann Bancroft, Arctic explorer
Walter Mondale, U.S. vice president

See also
 Copas, Minnesota

References

External links
 City of Scandia, MN – Official website
 Gammelgarden Museum
 Scandia, Minnesota at the Minnesota Historical Society
 St. Croix 360-River stories to inspire stewardship: Log House Landing – Gateway to Scandia
 Washington County Barn Quilt Trail

Cities in Washington County, Minnesota
Cities in Minnesota
Populated places established in 2007
2007 establishments in Minnesota